FSY may refer to:
 Footscray railway station, in Victoria, Australia
 Forsys Metals, a Canadian mining company
 For the Strength of Youth (disambiguation), several meanings within The Church of Jesus Christ of Latter-day Saints